Tal Hen (born August 4, 1979) is a former Israeli football player.

Career

Hen began his career as a defender for Hapoel Tzafririm Holon F.C. youth team. Hen also captained the Israeli national youth team.

In 2000 Hen transferred to Maccabi Netanya.

A year later he moved to Hapoel Haifa who  were relegated to the National League that season and played there the following year.

During the 2003/2004 season he transferred to Hapoel Tel Aviv. On his debut Tal scored the first goal of three that led the team to a victory against Beitar Jerusalem. That performance secured his place in the first team squad. Throughout the 2004/2005 season he was one of the most prominent players in the team as he was one of the players that helped Hapoel Tel Aviv avoid relegation from the Israeli Premier League. Due to his sterling performances Hen was called up to the Israel national football team.

He received the accolade of “Exceptional Player” from Hapoel Tel Aviv fans at the end of the 2004/2005 season.

He won the Israeli Cup in the 2005/2006 season, this was his first piece of silverware.

As a boy he supported Arsenal F.C. and has said his favourite player was Steve Bould

Honours
Israel State Cup (3):
2006, 2007, 2013
 Toto Cup (Leumit) (1)
 2011
 Liga Leumit
 2011-12

References

1979 births
Living people
Israeli Jews
Israeli footballers
Hapoel Tzafririm Holon F.C. players
Hapoel Tel Aviv F.C. players
Maccabi Netanya F.C. players
Bnei Sakhnin F.C. players
Hapoel Ramat Gan F.C. players
Hapoel Bnei Lod F.C. players
Liga Leumit players
Israeli Premier League players
Footballers from Holon
Israeli people of Moroccan-Jewish descent
Association football central defenders